Kotonofuji Muneyoshi (born 7 November 1951 as Muneyoshi Fujisawa) is a former sumo wrestler from Rusutsu, Hokkaidō, Japan. He made his professional debut in May 1967 and reached the top division in July 1974. His highest rank was maegashira 5. Upon retirement from active competition he became an elder in the Japan Sumo Association under the name Oguruma. He left the Sumo Association in November 1985, as his elder name was needed by the retiring Kotokaze. He is now the proprietor of a chanko restaurant in the Kagurazaka neighborhood of Tokyo.

Career record

See also
Glossary of sumo terms
List of sumo tournament second division champions

References

1951 births
Living people
Japanese sumo wrestlers
Sumo people from Hokkaido
Sadogatake stable sumo wrestlers